Shri Krishna Setu (Munger Ganga Bridge) is a rail-cum-road bridge across the Ganges, at Munger in the Indian state of Bihar and named after first Chief Minister of Bihar Shri Krishna Singh. The bridge connects the Munger-Jamalpur twin cities in Munger District to various districts of North Bihar. Srikrishna Setu Munger Ganga Bridge is the third rail-cum-road bridge over Ganga in Bihar.

The bridge forms a link between NH 33 on the southern side of the Ganges and NH 31 on the northern side of the Ganges. The Bridge connects districts of Begusarai and Khagaria to the Divisional headquarters Munger city.

History  

Construction work on the bridge was inaugurated by Atal Bihari Vajpayee, Prime Minister, through video conference system, in 2002.
The bridge was formally opened for freight trains on 12 March 2016 by Prime Minister Narendra Modi. It was finally opened for passenger trains on 11 April 2016 by Minister of State for Railways, Manoj Sinha, by flagging off Begusarai-Jamalpur DEMU train. In his inaugural speech, the MOS Mr. Manoj Sinha announced that the bridge will be named "Sri Krishna Setu" (श्रीकृष्ण सेतु) in the honour of the great freedom fighter, premier and first Chief Minister of Bihar, Dr. Srikrishna Sinha "Sri Babu".

The bridge was opened to road traffic in February 2022, after the approach roads on the both sides were completed.

Railway stations 
Jamalpur-Khagaria and Begusarai lines.

Services 
At present pairs of trains run on this bridge:
03450/51 Jamalpur Tilrath Jamalpur DEMU
03453/54 Jamalpur Tilrath Jamalpur DEMU
03473/74 Jamalpur Khagaria Jamalpur DEMU
03475/76 Jamalpur khagaria Jamalpur DEMU
15625/26 Agartala Deogarh Agartala Weekly Express
05509/10 Saharsa Jamalpur Saharsa MEMU Special
09451/52 Gandhidham Bhagalpur Gandhidham Express Special
15553/54 Bhagalpur Jaynagar Bhagalpur Special

See also 
 
 

List of road–rail bridges
List of longest bridges above water in India

References 

Bridges in Bihar
Munger district
Khagaria district
Bridges over the Ganges
Road bridges in India
Railway bridges in India
Double-decker bridges
Road-rail bridges in India
Bridges completed in 2016
2016 establishments in Bihar